Lebanon is scheduled to compete in the 2017 Asian Winter Games in Sapporo and Obihiro, Japan from February 19 to 26. The country is scheduled to compete in one sport (three disciplines). The team will consist of eight athletes (four men and four women). The team was officially named by the Lebanese Olympic Committee on January 30, 2017, and later on February 7, the team was introduced officially.

Background
With the FIS Alpine World Ski Championships 2017 being held in close proximity to these games, the Lebanese Ski Federation has opted to send its top four male and female athletes to the World Championships. The fifth and sixth ranked athletes per gender, according to results from 2015 and 2016 were selected to compete at these games.

Competitors
The following table lists the Lebanese delegation per sport and gender.

Alpine skiing

Lebanon's alpine skiing team consists of four athletes (two men and two women).
Men
Raul Anis Asmar
Cyril Kayrouz

Women
Sophia Marie Fayad
Carlie Maria Iskandar

Cross-country skiing

Lebanon's cross-country skiing team consists of two athletes (one man and one woman).

Man
Samer Tawk

Woman
Lea Rahme

Snowboarding

Lebanon's snowboarding team consists of two athletes (one man and one woman).

References

Nations at the 2017 Asian Winter Games
Asian Winter Games
Lebanon at the Asian Winter Games